Făgetu de Sus may refer to several villages in Romania:

 Făgetu de Sus, a village in Poiana Vadului Commune, Alba County
 Făgetu de Sus, a village in Ghimeș-Făget Commune, Bacău County